Jacques Cadiou (born 11 December 1943) is a French former racing cyclist. He rode in the 1967 Tour de France.

Major results
1965
 1st Grand Prix d'Aix-en-Provence
1966
 4th GP Ouest–France
1968
 1st Grand Prix de Cannes
 4th Tour du Nord-Ouest
1969
 1st GP Monaco
1970
 1st Grand Prix de Saint-Raphaël
 3rd Overall Tour d'Indre-et-Loire
1971
 1st Stage 13b Volta a Portugal
 3rd Paris–Camembert
1972
 4th Overall Tour d'Indre-et-Loire
1973
 9th Bordeaux–Paris

References

1943 births
Living people
French male cyclists
People from Dourdan